In quantum field theory, the pole mass of an elementary particle is the limiting value of the rest mass of a particle, as the energy scale of measurement increases.

Running mass
In quantum field theory, quantities like coupling constant and mass "run" with the energy scale of high energy physics. The running mass of a fermion or massive boson depends on the energy scale at which the observation occurs, in a way described by a renormalization group equation (RGE) and calculated by a renormalization scheme such as the on-shell scheme or the minimal subtraction scheme. The running mass refers to a Lagrangian parameter whose value changes with the energy scale at which the renormalization scheme is applied. A calculation, typically done by a computerized algorithm intractable by paper calculations, relates the running mass to the pole mass. The algorithm typically relies on a perturbative calculation of the self energy.

Propagator pole
A loop in a Feynman diagram requires an integral over a continuum of possible energies and momenta. In general, the integrals of products of Feynman propagators diverge at propagator poles, and the divergences must be removed by renormalization. The process of renormalization might be thought of as a theory of cancellations of virtual particle paths, thus revealing the "bare" or renormalized physics, such as the pole mass.

See also
Bare mass
Landau pole

References

Quantum field theory
Renormalization group